The 2006 Lowland International Rotterdam Tour was the 9th (and last) UCI Women's Road World Cup running on the Lowland International Rotterdam Tour.
112 elite female cyclists took part in the race and 79 of them finished.

General standings (top 10) 

Results from CQ ranking and cyclingarchives.

World Cup standings (top 10 after race) 

Results from cyclingarchives.

References

2006 in women's road cycling
2006 in Dutch sport
2006 UCI Women's Road World Cup
Women's road bicycle races
International cycle races hosted by the Netherlands